Johnny West may refer to:

 Johnny West (action figure), action figure created by Louis Marx and Company
 Johnny West (drag racer), American drag racer
 Johnny West il mancino, 1965 Italian film directed by Gianfranco Parolini